Elections to Hartlepool Borough Council in the ceremonial county of County Durham in England were held on 2 May 2002. One third of the council was up for election and the council stayed under no overall control. At the same time an election took place for a directly elected mayor, which was won by independent candidate Stuart Drummond.

Mayoral election

Campaign
Five candidates stood in the election for mayor, one each from the three main political parties and two independents. The Labour candidate for mayor was Leo Gillen, a local businessman who had led the campaign in favour of introducing a directly elected mayor. The Liberal Democrats selected the leader of the council since 2000, Arthur Preece, as their candidate for mayor, while the Conservatives chose councillor Stephen Close. The first independent candidate, Stuart Drummond, was better known as H'Angus the Monkey the official mascot for the local football team Hartlepool United F.C. The other independent candidate was Ian Cameron, another local businessman.

Drummond campaigned on a pledge to give free bananas to all school pupils under 11 in Hartlepool. He received backing from the football club who paid his deposit and he promised that he would attempt to keep a local sports centre open, improve sporting facilities, tackle crime and reduce the number of councillors. His candidacy began as something of a joke but became more serious as he attracted support during the campaign.

A supplementary voting system was used in the mayoral election with second preferences being used if no candidate received over half of the vote. A local bookmaker initially made Drummond a 100–1 outsider in the mayoral election but soon had to suspend betting after receiving a lot of bets from local people.

Results
Stuart Drummond won the mayoral election defeating the Labour candidate Leo Gillen on second preferences. Drummond said that his victory was due to disillusionment with local politicians and said that he was serious about doing a good job for Hartlepool as mayor. Local Member of Parliament Peter Mandelson praised Drummond on his victory and described him as being "very committed". However other political opponents described the results as having made Hartlepool "a laughing stock".

Council election
In the previous election in 2000 the Labour party had lost control of the council which since then had been run by a coalition between the Liberal Democrats and Conservatives. Elections took place in 16 of the 17 wards with only Greatham ward not holding an election. Most attention was on the mayoral election but there was a large swing of 14.2% to Labour in the council election. However they were only able to gain one seat in Seaton ward from the Conservatives.

After the election, the composition of the council was
Labour 23
Liberal Democrat 12
Conservative 8
Independent 4

Summary of results

Ward results

References

2002 English local elections
2002
Mayoral elections in England
2000s in County Durham
May 2002 events in the United Kingdom